Al Wathba is a suburb of Abu Dhabi in the United Arab Emirates that has a wetland nearby. It is located not too far from the international airport.

History 
After Sheikh Zayed bin Sultan Al Nahyan became the Ruler of the Emirate of Abu Dhabi in 1966, he set about further developing the Emirate, spending on healthcare, education and infrastructure. As part of his plan to develop the city of Abu Dhabi, in the 1980s, he invited Sir William Atkins, of the company W.S. Atkins and Partners (Atkins), to plan the development of Abu Dhabi and what would become the satellites of Wathba, Shahama and Bani Yas, where a number of local Bedouins and immigrants from other parts of the Arabian Peninsula had settled under Sheikh Zayed's encouragement.

Wetland reserve 

Located between Bani Yas, Mussafah, and the Abu Dhabi–Al Ain Road, Al Wathba Wetland Reserve was established by Sheikh Zayed in 1998, and is home to birds like the greater flamingo, besides aquatic life. The reserve has been designated as a Ramsar site since 2013.

Al Wathba Jail
in the 1990s, Filipino worker Sarah Balabagan was held here on charges of murdering her employer which she claims was an act self-defence. She was intitially sentenced to death but was later pardoned after intervention from Sheikh Zayed. Her sentence was shortened to 1 year and she was later deported back to the Philippines.

In 2009, a member of the Abu Dhab Royal Famiiy, Issa bin Zayed Al Nahyan was the subject of a lawsuit brought to him by his employee whom he allegedly imprisoned and tortured in Al Wathba Jail.

In 2011, Ahmad Mansoor, who received the prestigious Martin Ennals Award for Human Rights Defenders in 2015 was jailed for speech related activity “publishing false information and rumours", Mansoor was held in solitary confinement and prohibited access to a lawyer.

Notable people 

 Hazza Al Mansouri, Emirati astronaut

See also 
 Al Marmoom Desert Conservation Reserve, Dubai
 Dubai Desert Conservation Reserve
 Jebel Hafeet National Park, Abu Dhabi
 Mangrove National Park, Abu Dhabi
 Ras Al Khor, Dubai
 Sir Abu Nu'ayr, Sharjah
 Sir Bani Yas, Abu Dhabi
 Wadi Wurayah, Fujairah
 Wildlife of the United Arab Emirates

References

External links 
 In pictures: First look at Abu Dhabi's Jumeirah Al Wathba Desert Resort and Spa

 
Populated places in the Emirate of Abu Dhabi
Ramsar sites in the United Arab Emirates
Central Region, Abu Dhabi